Laryngeal vein can refer to:
 Inferior laryngeal vein (vena laryngea inferior)
 Superior laryngeal vein (vena laryngea superior)